The 1965 All-Ireland Intermediate Hurling Championship was the fifth staging of the All-Ireland hurling championship. The championship ended on 19 September 1965.

Wexford were the defending champions, however, they were defeated in the home final. Cork won the title after defeating London by 2-20 to 5-5 in the final.

External links
 Rolls of honour

Intermediate
All-Ireland Intermediate Hurling Championship